Wagon Trail is a 1935 American western film directed by Harry L. Fraser and starring Harry Carey, Gertrude Messinger and Edward Norris. It was produced as an independent second feature in Hollywood's Poverty Row. It was re-released by Astor Pictures in 1948.

Plot
Clay Hartley Jr., the son of the town's sheriff, gets trapped in gambling debts by his future father-in-law, Collins. Collins coerces Junior to act as a lookout for a stagecoach robbery where a deputy sheriff is killed; the only one caught is Clay Junior. Clay Senior loses his badge and takes the opportunity to deal out harsh justice.

Cast
 Harry Carey as Sheriff Clay Hartley
 Gertrude Messinger as Joan Collins
 Edward Norris as 	Clay Hartley, Jr.
 Roger Williams as 	Mark Collins
 Earl Dwire as Deputy Joe Larkin 
 Chuck Morrison as Deputy Chuck
 John Elliott as Judge
 Chief Thundercloud as 	Henchman
 Lew Meehan as Henchman
 Barney Beasley as Henchman 
 Tex Palmer as Henchman

References

Bibliography
 Pitts, Michael R. Poverty Row Studios, 1929–1940. McFarland & Company, 2005.

External links
 

1935 films
1935 Western (genre) films
American Western (genre) films
Films directed by Harry L. Fraser
American black-and-white films
1930s English-language films
1930s American films